This group is empty.

See also
Appetite stimulants

References

A15